Maureen Beck is an American mountaineer, and a specialist in adaptive climbing. Born without a lower left arm, she has won six national titles, and won a gold medal at the 2014 Spanish Paraclimbing World Championships.

Beck is from Ellsworth, Maine and a graduate of the University of Vermont. She was inspired to take up climbing at the age of 12 after a counsellor said she did not have to do it on a camp course. Because there was no support for one-handed climbing, she devised a way of doing it herself. She accompanied Jim Ewing in a climb of the Lotus Flower Tower in the Cirque of the Unclimbables.

The 2018 documentary "Stumped" centered on Beck and her climbing career.

Honors and awards 
In 2019 Beck was named National Geographic Adventurer of the Year.  In May of 2022, Beck placed second at the IFSC Paraclimbing World Cup.

References

External links 

 Mo Beck's personal site 
 Beck's Instagram

Living people
American female climbers
Paraclimbers
University of Vermont alumni
Year of birth missing (living people)